Jeron Khalsa is a town and a gram panchayat in Niwari district in the Indian state of Madhya Pradesh.

Demographics
 India census, Jeron Khalsa had a population of 13,000. Total number of households is 1,768.  Males constitute 53% of the population and females 47%. Jeron Khalsa has an average literacy rate of 42%, lower than the national average of 59.5%: male literacy is 54%, and female literacy is 29%. In Jeron Khalsa, 18% of the population is under 6 years of age. Jeron khalsa has high brahmin population. It has a famous pond known as Sanera Tal .It is approximately 17 km from Prithvipur and 42 km from Jhansi, Uttar Pradesh.

References

Cities and towns in Tikamgarh district